Preston Gómez (April 20, 1923 – January 13, 2009) was a Cuban-born infielder, manager, coach and front-office official in Major League Baseball best known for managing three major league clubs: the San Diego Padres (1969–72), Houston Astros (1974–75) and Chicago Cubs (1980). He was born Pedro Gómez Martínez in Central Preston (now Guatemala), Cuba, and was given his nickname in U.S. professional baseball from his birthplace.

Playing career 
He played eight major league games as a shortstop and second baseman for the  Washington Senators, hitting .286 in seven at bats with two runs batted in.

Minor leagues 
He spent the next two decades in minor league baseball, as a player between 1944 and 1955, and then as manager of the Diablos Rojos del México, the "Mexico City Reds," in 1957 and 1958. He then managed in the farm systems of the Cincinnati Reds, Los Angeles Dodgers and New York Yankees. His 1959 Havana Sugar Kings were champion of the International League and won the Junior World Series; the following season, his Spokane Indians won 91 games and the 1960 Pacific Coast League championship.

Managerial and coaching career

Early career 
In , Gómez became third-base coach of the Dodgers, serving under Walter Alston through  and on two National League pennant-winners and one World Series champion.

San Diego Padres 
When Dodger executive vice president Buzzie Bavasi became president and part-owner of the expansion Padres, he named Gómez the first skipper in the team's major league history in August 1968. With the Padres, he had a record of 180 wins and 316 losses.

Houston Astros 

That season, the Astros posted an 81–81 record — Gómez' only .500 or better season as a big league manager. They began the year by losing 16 of their 24 April games, and were still in last place in the NL West after 127 games (at 47–80) on August 18. On that day, Gómez was released in favor of Bill Virdon. As the Astros' pilot, he finished with a record of 128 wins and 161 losses.
Once again, Gómez took to the coaching lines, for the St. Louis Cardinals and then back to the Dodgers (1977–79), where he assisted Tommy Lasorda for three seasons and coached in two more World Series — 1977 and 1978.

Chicago Cubs and California Angels 

The exposure led to one last major league managing job, with the  Cubs — but again Gómez met with frustration. The last-place Cubs dropped 52 of their first 90 games, and on July 23 Gómez was fired again, to be replaced by Joey Amalfitano. His career managing record, over seven years, was 346 wins, 529 losses (.395) with four last-place finishes.

Highly respected, Gómez remained in baseball as third-base coach (1981–84) of the California Angels, then served the Angels' organization as a special assignments scout and assistant to the general manager from 1985 until his death.

Ongoing no-hitters aborted 
On two occasions, Gómez sent in pinch-hitters to hit for pitchers who had pitched no-hitters through eight innings. He did this on July 21, 1970, with the Padres' Clay Kirby and on September 4, 1974, with the Astros' Wilson. Both pitchers were losing their respective games at the time they were pulled. In both cases, the hitting strategy failed, and the games were ultimately lost.

Managerial record

Death 
Gómez sustained major head injuries when he was struck by a vehicle at a Blythe, California, gas station on March 26, 2008. The accident occurred while Gómez was on his way home to Chino Hills, California, from the Angels' spring training in Arizona. He died from his injuries on January 13, 2009, in Fullerton, California, aged 85.

The 2009 Los Angeles Angels of Anaheim honored Gómez' memory with a uniform patch in the shape of a black diamond with the name "Preston" written in white.

See also

 List of St. Louis Cardinals coaches

References

External links

News report on the life of Preston Gomez
AP Obituary at the Orange County Register

1923 births
2009 deaths
Bismarck Barons players
Buffalo Bisons (minor league) players
California Angels coaches
California Angels executives
Charleston Senators players
Chicago Cubs managers
Cuban expatriate baseball players in the United States
Florence Steelers players
Havana Cubans players
Houston Astros coaches
Houston Astros managers
Houston Astros scouts
Los Angeles Dodgers coaches
Major League Baseball infielders
Major League Baseball players from Cuba
Major League Baseball third base coaches
Minneapolis Millers (baseball) players
New London Raiders players
Pedestrian road incident deaths
People from Mayarí
Road incident deaths in California
Saginaw Bears players
St. Louis Cardinals coaches
San Diego Padres managers
Spokane Indians managers
Toledo Mud Hens players
Trois-Rivières Royals players
Vicksburg Billies players
Washington Senators (1901–1960) players
Yakima Bears players